Leyte Gulf is a gulf in the Eastern Visayan region in the Philippines. The bay is part of the Philippine Sea of the Pacific Ocean, and is bounded by two islands; Samar in the north and Leyte in the west. On the south of the bay is Mindanao Island, separated from Leyte by the Surigao Strait. Dinagat Island partly encloses the gulf to the southeast, and the small Homonhon Island and Suluan Island, sit astride the eastern entrance to the Gulf.

Several municipalities are situated on the coast of the gulf: Balangiga, Giporlos, Guiuan, Lawaan, Mercedes, Quinapondan and Salcedo. There are also eleven marine reserves in the gulf region.

History
Leyte Gulf was also the scene of the Battle of Leyte Gulf, which extends to Surigao Strait during the Battle of Surigao Strait, the largest naval battle of World War II and started the end of Japanese occupation in the Philippines. During World War II the gulf was part of a large US Navy base Leyte-Samar Naval Base.

In 2013, Typhoon Haiyan stirred up a storm surge in Leyte Gulf, resulting in massive loss of lives, agricultural land and property along Leyte's shores.

Fishing

Leyte Gulf is identified by the Leyte State University as one of the important fishing grounds of Leyte and Samar. Like other rich fishing grounds such as Maqueda Bay and Carigara Bay, the gulf is known for abundant catches of anchovies, herring, shrimp and crabs. It was also once one of the richest sources of mud crabs in 1985.  Fish harvest has been in decline in the gulf due to the use of dynamite fishing. Typhoon Haiyan has damaged the hard coral cover within the gulf's area, further reducing the fish harvest.

Gallery

Notes

Gulfs of the Philippines
Landforms of Leyte (province)
Landforms of Samar (province)
Landforms of Eastern Samar